Sugarbaker may refer to:

Sugar-baker, a profession as the owner of a sugar house
Allan Sugarbaker
David Sugarbaker (1953–2018), American physician
Paul Sugarbaker (born 1941), American surgeon
Suzanne Sugarbaker, fictional character from American sitcom Designing Women